Rockhouse, also Rock House, is an unincorporated community in Austin County, in the U.S. state of Texas. According to the Handbook of Texas, the community had a population of 30 in 2000. It is located within the Greater Houston metropolitan area.

History
The community in what is now known as Rockhouse today was first settled in the late 1850s. German immigrant Victor Witte, from Hanover, built a house made out of stone at La Bahia Prairie on the Pastoren Creek headwaters. More settlers from Germany arrived and the community became known as Rockhouse. A post office was established at Rockhouse in 1871 and remained in operation until 1907. The community originally lay in neighboring Fayette County, but a boundary change moved it into Austin County. It began to decline when the Missouri-Kansas-Texas Railway bypassed the community in the 1890s. It had 25 residents and only one business in 1936. It remained at that number in 1948 and grew to 30 in 2000.

Geography

Education
Rockhouse had its own school in 1918, with 12 students enrolled. Today, the community is served by the Bellville Independent School District.

References

Unincorporated communities in Austin County, Texas
Unincorporated communities in Texas